Amro Mohammed (born 28 June 1989) is a Saudi handball player for Al-Ahli and the Saudi Arabian national team.

He represented Saudi Arabia at the 2019 World Men's Handball Championship.

References

1989 births
Living people
Saudi Arabian male handball players
21st-century Saudi Arabian people